In baseball, a walk-off home run is a home run that ends the game. For a home run to end the game, it must be hit in the bottom of the final inning of the game and generate enough runs to exceed the opponent's score.  Because the opponent will not have an opportunity to score any more runs, there is no need to finish the inning and the teams can walk off the field immediately.

The winning runs must still be counted at home plate.

History and usage of the term
Although the concept of a game-ending home run is as old as baseball, the adjective "walk-off" attained widespread use only in the late 1990s and early 2000s.

The first known usage of the word in print appeared in the San Francisco Chronicle on April 21, 1988, Section D, Page 1. Chronicle writer Lowell Cohn wrote an article headlined "What the Eck?" about Oakland reliever Dennis Eckersley's unusual way of speaking: "For a translation, I go in search of Eckersley. I also want to know why he calls short home runs 'street pieces,' and home runs that come in the last at-bat of a game 'walkoff pieces' ..." Although the term originally was coined with a negative connotation, in reference to the pitcher (who must "walk off" the field with his head hung in shame), it has come to acquire a more celebratory connotation, for the batter who circles the bases with pride and with the adulation of the home crowd.

Other types of "walk-off" wins
Sportscasters have applied the term "walk-off hit" to any kind of hit that drives in the winning run to end the game. It is an expansion of the term to call a hit a walk-off when what ends the game is not the hit, but the defense's failure to make a play. The terms "walk-off hit by pitch", "walk-off walk" (a base on balls with the bases loaded), "walk-off wild pitch", "walk-off reach-on-error", "walk-off steal of home", "walk-off passed ball", and "walk-off balk" have been also applied, with the latter dubbed a "balk-off". The day after Eric Bruntlett executed a game-ending unassisted triple play for the Philadelphia Phillies against the New York Mets on August 23, 2009, the Philadelphia Daily News used the term "walk-off triple play" in a subheadline describing the moment, although it was not a true walk-off.

Walk-off grand slam

A grand slam is a home run hit with all three bases occupied by baserunners ("bases loaded"), thereby scoring four runs—the most possible in one play. A walk-off home run with the bases loaded is therefore known as a walk-off grand slam. Since 1916 there have been more than 250 walk-off grand slams hit during Major League Baseball's regular season. From 1903 onwards, only one walk-off grand slam has been hit in the postseason, by Nelson Cruz of the Texas Rangers in Game 2 of the 2011 ALCS.

The most recent walk-off grand slam was hit by Giancarlo Stanton of the New York Yankees on September 20, 2022, against the Pittsburgh Pirates. The Yankees also hit the previous walk-off grand slam just one month earlier, when Josh Donaldson hit a walk-off grand slam against the Tampa Bay Rays on August 17, 2022.

Three players have hit two walk-off grand slams in a season, Cy Williams in 1926, Jim Presley in 1986, and Steve Pearce in 2017. Pearce's first was on July 27 (an 8–4 victory over the Oakland Athletics) followed by his second on July 30 (an ultimate grand slam, for an 11–10 win over the Los Angeles Angels), becoming the first player in MLB history to hit multiple walk-off grand slams within the span of a single week.

Only five pitchers in major league history have surrendered two game-ending grand slam home runs in one season, according to the Elias Sports Bureau:
Rodríguez is the only pitcher to surrender two game-winning grand slams to two rookies.
Norris surrendered both in the same week, and it was the second game-winning walk-off grand slam by Pearce in the same week.

A walk-off grand slam that erases a three-run deficit is also called an ultimate grand slam. There have been 32 such instances documented in major league history – all taking place during the regular season, 16 of those coming with two outs. Of the 32 home runs, only Roberto Clemente's was hit inside the park, at spacious Forbes Field on July 25, 1956. Pirates manager/third base coach Bobby Bragan instructed him to stop at third, but Clemente ran through the stop sign to score the winning run. Alan Trammell's June 21, 1988 and Chris Hoiles' May 17, 1996 grand slams occurred under the most dire situation: bases loaded, two outs, full count, bottom of the ninth inning, and down by three runs. Donaldson's and Stanton's aforementioned walk-off grand slams are each the two most recent occurrences of an ultimate grand slam.

Walk-off celebration injury 
Walk-off celebrations typically consist of an entire baseball team leaving the dugout to meet a player at home plate after the batter hits a walk-off home run, or at whichever base the hitter happens to reach if a traditional base hit results in a walk-off victory. Players often encircle teammates who hit a walk-off before dancing and roughhousing to celebrate their victory. During a walk-off celebration on May 29, 2010, Kendrys Morales, then a member of the Los Angeles Angels of Anaheim, broke his left leg while celebrating a walk-off grand slam. As a result of this injury, team manager Mike Scioscia instituted new guidelines for his team that ensured a much tamer response to all subsequent walk-off victories.

Relevant rules
The rules of baseball provide that:
 A batter is entitled to a home run only "when he shall have touched all bases legally." (Rule 6.09(d); also 7.05(a))
 A batter is out, on appeal, for failing to touch each base in order or for passing a preceding runner.  In some cases, all runs that score are negated.  (Rule 7.10 and 7.12)
 On a game-winning hit, a batter is credited for the full number of bases only if "the batter runs out his hit." (Rule 10.06(f))
 A game-winning home run is allowed to complete before the game ends, even if it puts the home team ahead by more than one run. (Rule 4.11(c), Exception; also 10.06(g))

The first point above was problematic in the 1976 American League Championship Series between the New York Yankees and the Kansas City Royals. The Yankees and Royals entered the bottom of the ninth inning of the decisive fifth game with the score tied, 6–6; Mark Littell was the pitcher for Kansas City, and Chris Chambliss was the first batter for New York.  Chambliss hit Littell's first pitch into the right field bleachers to win the game and the American League pennant for the Yankees. However, Yankees fans ran onto the field at Yankee Stadium to celebrate the victory, and prevented Chambliss from rounding the bases and touching home plate.  Recognizing the impossibility of Chambliss successfully negotiating the sea of people who had been on the field, umpires later escorted Chambliss back out to home plate and watched as he touched it with his foot, thereby making the Yankees victory "official". (A comment to Rule 4.09(b) permits the umpires to award the run if fans prevent the runner from touching home plate.)

The third point above led to Robin Ventura's "Grand Slam Single" in the 1999 NLCS. In the bottom of the 15th inning, the New York Mets tied the score against the Atlanta Braves at 3–3. Ventura came to bat with the bases loaded, and hit a game-winning grand slam to deep right. Roger Cedeño scored from third and John Olerud appeared to score from second, but Todd Pratt, on first base when Ventura hit the home run, went to second, then turned around and hugged Ventura as the rest of the team rushed onto the field. The official ruling was that because Ventura never advanced past first base, it was not a home run but a single, and thus only Cedeño's run counted, making the official final score 4–3.

The fourth point above was not a rule prior to 1920; instead, the game ended at the moment the winning run scored.  This rule affected the scoring of 40 hits, from 1884 to 1918, that would now be scored as game-winning home runs. Babe Ruth would have been credited with 715 career home runs had the modern rule been in effect in 1918; in a 10-inning game Ruth's fence-clearing, walk-off RBI hit was scored a triple because the game was deemed over when the lead baserunner reached home.

List of walk-off home runs in the postseason and All-Star Game

In the charts below, home runs that ended a postseason series are denoted by the series standing in bold.  Home runs in which the winning team was trailing at the time are denoted by the final score in bold. Grand slams are denoted by the situation in bold.

Follow the linked year on the far left for detailed information on that series.

World Series

Playoff tiebreakers

Other postseason series

Wild Card Game/Series

Division Series

League Championship Series

All-Star Game

Other notable walk-offs

Notable fictional prospective walk-off home run
Although the term itself would not be used until over 100 years later, Casey at the Bat, an 1888 poem by Ernest Thayer, features a potential walk-off home run. Although pessimistic at first, the home team's fans become more optimistic when their star, Casey, unexpectedly gets a chance to hit a walk-off three run home run. In the end they go home disappointed, however, when Casey strikes out rather than hitting the home run the fans expect.

See also

 Game-winning RBI
 Homer in the Gloamin'
 Career record for walk-off home runs
Chasing a target, the cricket equivalent

Notes

References

External links
 Baseball-Reference.com Play Index – game-winning home runs which ended a postseason series
 YankeeNumbers.com – A list of all walk-off home runs in New York Yankee history...regular and post-season.

Batting (baseball)
History of Major League Baseball
Home run w
Sports accomplishments